Peiting Nord station is a railway station in the municipality of Peiting, in Bavaria, Germany. It is located on the Schongau–Peißenberg line of Deutsche Bahn.

Services
 the following services stop at Peiting Nord:

References

External links
 
 Peiting Nord layout 
 

Railway stations in Bavaria
Buildings and structures in Weilheim-Schongau